The Alaska Rural Communications Service (ARCS) is a statewide network of low-powered television stations, serving 235 communities throughout the Alaskan Bush areas. Developed in the late 1970s, the network is based in Anchorage, Alaska, and is operated by Alaska Public Media. Programming is beamed via satellite to the rural transmitters owned by the Alaska state government.

Low powered television broadcasts began in 1959, with a transmitter in the Suntrana-Healy area. In 1972, the Alaskan Public Broadcasting Commission (APBC) received FCC permission to test the use of videotapes to bring television to areas of Alaska with no ability to access terrestrial repeaters; tests began in three villages the next year. Alaska's state legislature then provided funding to the state's Office of Telecommunications to lease a satellite transponder and modify existing telephone earth stations for television in 1976. The first satellite-fed television transmissions began on January 15, 1977, in Tenakee Springs. A Telecommunications Committee under the Alaska Federation of Natives selected programming for the new service, the committee became known as the Rural Alaska Television Network (RATNET). In 1995, after state funding cuts, Bethel Broadcasting, Incorporated, operators of KYUK, assumed responsibility for the service. Control of ARCS passed from Alaska Public Broadcasting, Inc. to Alaska Public Media, which also operates Anchorage's PBS member station KAKM, in 2021.

Programming on ARCS is a selection of shows from the four commercial broadcast networks (NBC, CBS, ABC, Fox) and syndication, via the Anchorage stations; plus PBS programming from KAKM and other PBS members in the state; occasionally, ARCS produces some of its own programming (including local sports coverage). Anchorage stations provide their programming to ARCS free of charge with the condition that advertising is allowed to remain.

There is currently no CW programming available on ARCS (nor did it air programming from The WB), and though in the past the network carried MyNetworkTV programming from KYES-TV (and previously, UPN), it has not since its 2009 conversion from a network to an all-repeat programming service; it did carry other syndicated programming from that station, mainly on weekends, until KYES-TV took over the CBS affiliation from KTVA on August 1, 2020 (KYES-TV's former programming shifted to its fourth subchannel and will continue to air on ARCS on weekends). In late February 2021, KYES's call letters were changed to KAUU, to complement sister station KTUU.

Even though much of ARCS' programming contains commercials, the operation of ARCS is partially funded by donations from its viewers, just like member stations of PBS, as well as those of the Christian-based Trinity Broadcasting Network.

Many of ARCS' stations which were in analog were converted to digital broadcasting as part of the FCC mandated digital television transition which was originally scheduled for July 13, 2021 for low-power TV stations as well as translator stations in Alaska. The network flash cut its transmitters once the transition is completed, shutting down its analog transmissions and switching on their digital transmitters at the same time. This has also allowed ARCS to add new subchannels, including 360 North, First Nations Experience, and UAF TV via Alaska Public Media's KAKM-TV.

In June 2021, the FCC granted a waiver for the service to continue analog television service on 15 of its transmitters until January 10, 2022, so that they could continue to complete the upgrade of its low-powered stations to digital. The FCC cited Alaska's climate and short construction season, the remoteness of the transmitter sites in question, and the fact that all the transmitters represented the sole over-the-air television service in each of the communities involved. In a subsequent filing to the FCC in July 2022, the State of Alaska and Alaska Public Media indicated that they planned to let construction permits for 37 of the repeaters lapse.

List of stations
As of June 2021, the ARCS had 169 station licenses, of which 106 were operational. The ARCS is seen on the following low-powered television stations:

 K08KD-D Alakanuk
 K08HU-D Aleknagik
 K11QI-D Ambler
 K07SS-D Angoon
  Bettles
  Birch Creek
  Chalkyitsik
  Chevak
 K07RY-D Chignik
  Circle
  Cold Bay
 K08KO-D Cooper Landing
  Dot Lake
  Eagle Village
  Elfin Cove
 K03GA-D Elim
  False Pass
 K04LZ-D Galena
  Galena
  Gambell
 K07QX-D Golovin
  Goodnews Bay
  Grayling
 K04MR-D Gustavus
 K07RJ-D Holy Cross
 K07QD-D Hooper Bay
 K04MM-D Hyder
  Igiugig
  Kake
  Kalskag
  Kaltag
  Karluk
  King Cove
  King Mountain, etc.
 K07OL-D Kipnuk
  Kodiak
 K09SL-D Kotlik
  Kotzebue
  Koyuk
  Kwethluk
 K07TH-D Lime Village
  Manley Hot Springs
 K07TK-D Marshall
  McGrath
 K09NI-D Mekoryuk
  Moose Pass
  Mountain Village
  Napakiak
  Nelson Lagoon
 K04MT-D Newtok
  Nightmute
 K09OW-D Nome
 K02LJ-D Nondalton
  Northway
 K04JF-D Nulato
  Old Harbor
  Pedro Bay
 K04LB-D Pelican
 K09NK-D Perryville
  Petersburg
  Pilot Point
 K15AU-D Pilot Station
  Port Heiden
  Port Lions
  Sand Point
 K07RD-D Savoonga
  Shageluk
 K09NH-D Shungnak
 Slana
  Sleetmute
K09RE-D St. George
 K07RK-D St. Mary's
K09QX-D St. Michael
 K09RB-D St. Paul
  Stony River
 K07RB-D Tanana
  Tenakee Springs
  Togiak
  Tok
 K11QG-D Toksook Bay
  Trapper Creek
  Unalakleet
  Unalaska
  Valdez
  Venetie
K04MN-D Wales
K13TD-D White Mountain
  Womens Bay

References

External links
 

Television networks in the United States
ABC network affiliates
CBS network affiliates
Fox network affiliates
NBC network affiliates
PBS member stations
Public television in the United States
Television stations in Alaska